Mamadou Amir (born 26 May 1946) is an Egyptian water polo player. He competed in the men's tournament at the 1964 Summer Olympics.

References

External links

1946 births
Living people
Egyptian male water polo players
Olympic water polo players of Egypt
Water polo players at the 1964 Summer Olympics
Place of birth missing (living people)
20th-century Egyptian people